Reptyl is a fictional character appearing in American comic books published by Marvel Comics.

Fictional character biography
Cap'n Reptyl was born on an unnamed alien planet in the Coal Sack Nebula. He later became the leader of a band of space pirates. He sheltered a Skrull posing as the Contemplator from Galactus's vengeance. Reptyl captured the Silver Surfer and Galactus's herald Nova. He battled the escaped Nova, and was forced to release the Silver Surfer. He partially devoured the Contemplator. He set Firelord and Starfox against the Silver Surfer and Nova. He abducted Lady Karlot and stole her treasure. He later exchanged his crew with the Stranger for Empress S'byll of the Skrulls, and formed an alliance. He then battled and seemingly killed the Super-Skrull. Reptyl led the Skrull fleet against the Kree fleet, and was almost killed by Clumsy Foulup. He was later attacked by the Super-Skrull, and cast adrift in space.

Reptyl, still alive, eventually metamorphosed into Reptyl Prime. He then attacked a Kree spacecraft. He battled the Silver Surfer again, and escaped. Following that encounter, he intended to be the progenitor of reptilian evolution.

Reptyl was next seen among a host of other alien criminals imprisoned on Earth during the Maximum Security event.

Reptyl was later given god-like powers by Thanos. Shortly thereafter he came into conflict with Mantis and the Avengers. Before that adventure concluded, Reptyl lost his newfound abilities and reverted to his normal power level.

Powers and abilities
Reptyl possessed superhuman strength, speed, stamina, durability, agility, and reflexes as a result of his reptilian alien heritage, as well as a vulnerability to extreme cold. He resembled a humanoid dinosaur (Saurornithoides) with green scaly ridged hide, sharpened teeth and claws, and a  tail. He was an experienced armed and unarmed combatant, a highly skilled leader and space pilot, and a master of most known hand weapons. He wore body armor and a space suit of alien materials, and carried a ray-pistol and sword.

Reptyl later became Reptyl Prime as a result of genetic mutation. His superhuman strength and stamina increased, he gained the ability to fly at warp speed, and was no longer vulnerable to cold. He resembles a  mythological dragon with grey scaly ridged hide, sharpened teeth and  claws, bat-like wings [ wingspan], and a  spiked tail. Reptyl Prime also gained the ability to manipulate cosmic energy in the form of concussive blasts of cosmic force, and the ability to exist in space unprotected.

In other media

Video games
 Reptyl is featured as a boss in the NES Silver Surfer game.

References

External links
http://www.marvel.com/universe/Reptyl

Characters created by Steve Englehart
Comics characters introduced in 1988
Fictional characters with superhuman durability or invulnerability
Fictional reptiles
Fictional space pilots
Marvel Comics aliens
Marvel Comics characters who can move at superhuman speeds
Marvel Comics characters with accelerated healing
Marvel Comics characters with superhuman strength
Marvel Comics extraterrestrial supervillains
Marvel Comics supervillains
Space pirates